The Conquest of Chile is a period in Chilean historiography that starts with the arrival of Pedro de Valdivia to Chile in 1541 and ends with the death of Martín García Óñez de Loyola in the Battle of Curalaba in 1598, and the destruction of the Seven Cities in 1598–1604 in the Araucanía region.

This was the period of Spanish conquest of territories, founding of cities, establishment of the Captaincy General of Chile, and defeats ending its further colonial expansion southwards. However the continued attack never improved, thus the Arauco War continued, and the Spanish were never able to recover their short control in Araucanía south of the Bío Bío River. The Battle of Guadalgo in 1566 was a huge blow to Spanish morale.

Background

Chile at the time of the Spanish arrivals

According to traditional historiography, the Spanish first came to Central Chile the territory had been under Inca rule for about than 60 years. There are however dissenting views, recent works suggest at least 130 years of Inca presence in Central Chile, and historian Osvaldo Silva posits remarkably short chronologies of direct Inca rule and military involvement. According to Silva the last Inca push towards the south were made as late as in the 1530s. The main settlements of the Inca Empire in Chile lay along the Aconcagua River, Mapocho River, and the Maipo River. Quillota in Aconcagua Valley was likely their foremost settlement. As it appear to be the case in the other borders of the Inca Empire, the southern border was composed of several zones: first, an inner, fully incorporated zone with mitimaes protected by a line of pukaras (fortresses) and then an outer zone with Inca pukaras scattered among allied tribes. This outer zone would according to historian José Bengoa have been located between the Maipo and Maule Rivers.

However the largest indigenous population were the Mapuches living south of the Inca borders in the area spanning from the Itata River to Chiloé Archipelago. The Mapuche population between the Itata River and Reloncaví Sound has been estimated at 705,000–900,000 in the mid-16th century by historian José Bengoa. Mapuches lived in scattered hamlets, mainly along the great rivers of Southern Chile. All major population centres lay at the confluences of rivers. Mapuches preferred to build their houses on hilly terrain or isolated hills rather than on plains and terraces. The Mapuche people represented an unbroken culture dating back to as early as 600 to 500 BC. Yet Mapuches had been influenced over centuries by Central Andean cultures such as Tiwanaku. Through their contact with Incan invaders Mapuches would have for the first time met people with state-level organization. Their contact with the Inca is thought to have gavin them a collective awareness to distinguishing between them and the invaders and uniting them into loose geopolitical units despite their lack of state organization.

Mapuche territory had an effective system of roads before the Spanish arrival as evidenced by the fast advances of the Spanish conquerors. According to Zavala and co-workers (2021) the widespread gold-related toponyms in Mapuche lands and early Spanish reports of gold objects, plus the easiness for the Spanish to find gold mines suggests that gold mining did occur in Pre-Hispanic Chile south of Itata River, well beyond the borders of the Inca Empire.

First Spaniards in Chile
The first Spanish subjects to enter the territory of what would become Chile were the members of the Magellan expedition that discovered the Straits of Magellan before completing the world's first circumnavigation.

Gonzalo Calvo de Barrientos left Peru for Chile after a quarrel with the Pizarro brothers. The Pizarro brothers had accused Calvo de Barrientos of theft and had him cropped as punishment. Antón Cerrada joined Calvo de Barrientos in his exile.

Diego de Almagro ventured into present-day Bolivia and the Argentine Northwest in 1535. From there he crossed into Chile at the latitudes of Copiapó. Almagro's expedition was a failure as he did not find the riches he expected. Almagro's failed expedition gave the lands of Chile a bad reputation among the Spanish in Peru.

Pedro de Valdivia

Expedition to Chile 

In April 1539, Francisco Pizarro authorized Pedro de Valdivia as his lieutenant governor with orders to conquer Chile. That did not include monetary aid, which he had to procure on his own. Valdivia did so, in association with the merchant Francisco Martínez Vegaso, captain Alonso de Monroy, and Pedro Sanchez de la Hoz. Sanchez was the longtime secretary to Pizarro, who had returned from Spain with authorization from the king to explore the territories south of the Viceroyalty of Peru to the Strait of Magellan, also granting Valdivia the title of governor over lands taken from the indigenous people. This was the last campaign for the Spanish in Chile.

Valdivia came to the Valley of Copiapo and took possession in the name of the King of Spain and named it Nueva Extremadura, for his Spanish homeland of Extremadura. On February 12, 1541, he founded the city of Santiago de la Nueva Extremadura on Huelen hill (present-day Santa Lucia Hill).

Governor
Valdivia had rejected the position and titles due him while Pizarro was alive, as it could have been seen as an act of treason. He accepted the titles after the death of Francisco Pizarro. Pedro de Valdivia was named Governor and Captain-General of the Captaincy General of Chile on June 11, 1541.  He was the first Governor of Chile.

For long time Valdivia was preoccupied about other Spanish conquistadors disputing him what he saw as his domains. As long as he did not have a royal assignment this could very much happen. The Strait of Magellan was important in Valdivia's design for the Conquest of Chile, as perceived it was part of his Chilean albeit he never reached so far south.

Valdivia organized the first distribution of encomiendas and of indigenous peoples among the Spanish immigrants in Santiago. The Chilean region was not as rich in minerals as Peru, so the indigenous peoples were forced to work on construction projects and placer gold mining. The "conquest" was a challenge, with the first attack of Michimalonco in September 1541, burning the new settlement to the ground.

Valdivia authorized Juan Bohon to found the city of La Serena in 1544. The Juan Bautista Pastene expedition ventured to unexplored southern Chile in 1544. Arriving at the Bio-Bio River, started the Arauco War with the Mapuche people. The epic poem La Araucana (1576) by Alonso de Ercilla describes the Spanish viewpoint.

The Spanish won several battles, such as the Andalien battle, and Penco battle in 1550. The victories allowed Valdiva to found cities on the Mapuche homelands, such as Concepcion in 1550, La Imperial, Valdivia, and Villarrica in 1552, and Los Confines in 1553.

According to Pedro de Valdivia the Mapuche identified the Spanish as "ingas", meaning Incas, a word that stuck is now known under the form wingka meaning new-Inca. At the time of the initial contact Mapuches called horses "hueque ingas" in reference to the hueque according to Valdivia's letter to the Emperor. 

Lautaro led the Mapuche rebellion that killed Pedro de Valdivia in the battle of Tucapel in 1553.

Aspects of the Spanish conquest

Background of the conquistadores

Most conquistadores were Spanish men. A few where from elsewhere, like Juan Valiente who was a black-skinned African. Juan de Bohon (Johann von Bohon), the founder of La Serena and Barlolomeo Flores (Barotholomeus Blumental) are said to have been Germans. Navigator Juan Bautista Pastene was of Genoese origin. Inés Suárez stands out as a rare female conquistadora.

Founding of cities
The conquest of Chile was not carried out directly by the Spanish Crown but by Spaniards that formed enterprises for those purposes and gathered financial resources and soldiers for the enterprise by their own. In 1541 an expedition (enterprise) led by Pedro de Valdivia founded Santiago initiating the conquest of Chile. The first years were harsh for the Spaniards mainly due to their poverty, indigenous rebellions, the poor battle terrain, and frequent conspiracies. The inhabitants of Santiago in the mid-16th century were notoriously poorly dressed as result of a lack of armour and food supplies, with some Spanish even resorting to dress with hides from dogs, cats, sea lions, and foxes.  The second founding of La Serena in 1549 (initially founded in 1544 but destroyed by natives) was followed by the founding of numerous new cities in southern Chile halting only after Valdivia's death in 1553.

The Spanish colonization of the Americas was characterized by the establishments of cities in the middle of conquered territories. With the founding of each city a number of conquistadores became vecinos of that city being granted a solar and possibly also a chacra in the outskirts of the city, or a hacienda or estancia in more far away parts of the countryside. Apart from land, natives were also distributed among Spaniards since they were considered vital for carrying out any economic activity.

The cities founded, despite defeats in the Arauco War, were: Santiago (1541), La Serena (1544), Concepción (1550), La Imperial, Valdivia, Villarrica (1552), Los Confines (1553), Cañete (1557), Osorno (1558), Arauco (1566), Castro (1567), Chillán (1580), and Santa Cruz de Oñez (1595).

The destruction of the Seven Cities in 1600, and ongoing Arauco War stopped Spanish expansion southward.

Use of yanacona

Gold mining
Early Spaniards extracted gold from placer deposits using indigenous labour. This contributed to usher in the Arauco War as native Mapuches lacked a tradition of forced labour like the Andean mita and largely refused to serve the Spanish. The key area of the Arauco War were the valleys around Cordillera de Nahuelbuta where the Spanish designs for this region was to exploit the placer deposits of gold using unfree Mapuche labour from the nearby and densely populated valleys. Deaths related to mining contributed to a population decline among native Mapuches. Another site of Spanish mining was the city of Villarrica. At this city the Spanish mined gold placers and silver. The original site of the city was likely close to modern Pucón. However at some point in the 16th century it is presumed the gold placers were buried by lahars flowing down from nearby Villarrica Volcano. This prompted settlers to relocate the city further west at its modern location.

Mining activity declined in the late 16th century as the richest part of placer deposits, which are usually the most shallow, became exhausted. The decline was aggravated by the collapse of the Spanish cities in the south following the battle of Curalaba (1598) which meant for the Spaniards the loss of both the main gold districts and the largest indigenous labour sources.

Compared to the 16th and 18th centuries, Chilean mining activity in the 17th century was very limited.

Southern limit of the conquests
Pedro de Valdivia sought originally to conquer all of southern South America to the Straits of Magellan (53° S). He did however only reach Reloncaví Sound (41°45' S). Later in 1567 Chiloé Archipelago (42°30' S) was conquered, from there on southern expansion of the Spanish Empire halted. The Spanish are thought to have lacked incentives for further conquests south. The indigenous populations were scarce and had ways of life that differed from the sedentary agricultural life the Spanish were accostumed to. The harsh climate in the fjords and channels of Patagonia may also have deterred further expansion. Indeed, even in Chiloé did the Spanish encounter difficulties to adapt as their attempts to base the economy on gold extraction and a "hispanic-mediterranean" agricultural model failed.

Timeline of events

See also
Incas in Central Chile
Spanish colonization of the Americas
Spanish conquest of Peru
Viceroyalty of Peru

Notes

References

Sources 
 Pedro de Valdivia, Cartas de Pedro de Valdivia (Letters of Pedro Valdivia), University of Chile: Diarios, Memorias y Relatos Testimoniales: (on line in Spanish) 
 Jerónimo de Vivar,  Crónica y relación copiosa y verdadera de los reinos de Chile (Chronicle and abundant and true relation of the kingdoms of Chile) ARTEHISTORIA REVISTA DIGITAL; Crónicas de América (on line in Spanish)
 Alonso de Góngora Marmolejo, Historia de Todas las Cosas que han Acaecido en el Reino de Chile y de los que lo han gobernado (1536-1575) (History of All the Things that Have happened in the Kingdom of Chile and of those that have governed it (1536-1575)), University of Chile: Document Collections in complete texts: Cronicles (on line in Spanish) 
 Pedro Mariño de Lobera, Crónica del Reino de Chile , escrita por el capitán Pedro Mariño de Lobera....reducido a nuevo método y estilo por el Padre Bartolomé de Escobar.  Edición digital a partir de Crónicas del Reino de Chile Madrid, Atlas, 1960, pp. 227-562, (Biblioteca de Autores Españoles ; 569-575).  Biblioteca Virtual Miguel de Cervantes (on line in Spanish)
 Melchor Jufré del Águila; Compendio historial del Descubrimiento y Conquista del Reino de Chile (Historical compendium of the Discovery and Conquest of the Kingdom of Chile), University of Chile: Document Collections in complete texts: Cronicles (on line in Spanish)
 Diego de Rosales, “Historia General del Reino de Chile”, Flandes Indiano, 3 tomos. Valparaíso 1877 - 1878.
 [  Historia general de el Reyno de Chile: Flandes Indiano Vol. 1] 
  Historia general de el Reyno de Chile: Flandes Indiano Vol. 2 
 [  Historia general de el Reyno de Chile: Flandes Indiano Vol. 3] 
 Vicente Carvallo y Goyeneche,  Descripcion Histórico Geografía del Reino de Chile (Description Historical Geography of the Kingdom of Chile), University of Chile: Document Collections in complete texts: Chronicles (on line in Spanish)

Mapuche
Spanish conquests in the Americas
Rebellions against the Spanish Empire
Wars involving Spain
16th century in the Captaincy General of Chile
Viceroyalty of Peru